Birger Jarl, also known as Birger Magnusson (21 October 1266), was a Swedish statesman, jarl, and a member of the House of Bjelbo, who played a pivotal role in the consolidation of Sweden.  Birger also led the Second Swedish Crusade, which established Swedish rule in Finland. Additionally, he is traditionally attributed to have founded the Swedish capital, Stockholm, around 1250. Birger used the Latin title of Dux Sweorum ("Duke of Sweden"), and the design of his coronet combined those used by continental European and English dukes.

Biography

Early life 

Birger grew up and spent his adolescence in Bjälbo, Östergötland, but the exact date of his birth remains uncertain and available historical sources are contradictory.  Examinations of his mortal remains indicate that he was probably about 50 upon his death in 1266, which would indicate a birth around 1216.  However, his father Magnus Minnesköld is assumed to have died no later than 1210, which would lead to an assumed birth a few years earlier.  In any case, he was the son of Ingrid Ylva, who according to Olaus Petri was a daughter of Sune Sik and granddaughter of King Sverker I of Sweden, which would make Birger descended from the House of Sverker.  His brothers or half-brothers — Eskil, Karl, and Bengt — were all born long before 1200, and it can therefore be assumed that they had another mother.  He was also a nephew of the jarl Birger Brosa from the House of Bjelbo.  The combination of this background proved to be of vital importance.

Birger, thus most likely born at the time of the Battle of Gestilren in 1210 and named after his uncle Birger Brosa  (one of the most potent men of the era, who died in 1202), started his career in the mid-1230s by marrying  Ingeborg Eriksdotter, the sister of King Eric XI of Sweden according to the Eric Chronicles (Erikskrönikan), following fierce rivalry with other suitors.

During the following 15 years Birger consolidated his position and was probably one of the most influential men years before being formally given the title jarl in 1248 by King Eric XI.  Birger was later claimed to have been responsible for a military campaign against the Novgorod Republic that Russians claim ended in a victory by Alexander Nevsky during a battle the Russians refer to as the Neva Battle in 1240. While Swedish sources give no information on the battle at all, a 16th-century Russian legend tells that the Swedish "king" was wounded in the face while dueling against Prince Alexander Nevsky himself.

Although Birger Jarl saw many battles, some have speculated that traces of a sword blow in Birger's cranium might have originated from this battle. However, the original 14th-century Russian record of the battle gives no information on this at all.

Career 

When the papal diplomat William of Modena visited present Sweden around 1248, he urged the Swedish kings to fulfill the rules of the Catholic Church, an exhortation which Birger seems to have taken as a chance to strengthen his position by simply taking the side of the church against other members of his family (alternatively it's possible to interpret this as a manifestation of his pious side). This was a choice of historical importance as it was to make Birger a jarl powerful enough to ultimately wind up the office, thus making him the last Swedish jarl ever, even called as the "first true king of Sweden" by historians. As this happened during an era when the inherited concept Folkung became more of a political party, it also meant Swedish magnates lost most of their influence which paved the way for a consolidated Swedish kingdom supported by the Pope.

In 1247, royal troops led by Birger at the Battle of Sparrsätra (Slaget vid Sparrsätra) fought with Folkung forces led by pretender Holmger Knutsson, son of King Canute II. The Folkungs lost the battle and were unable to resist the central government and its taxes. Holmger Knutsson fled to Gästrikland and was captured there by Birger in the following year. Quickly brought to trial, he was beheaded.

In 1249, Birger succeeded in ending a decades-long period of hostilities with Norway. As a part of the Treaty of Lödöse, he also managed to marry off his daughter Rikissa, then only 11 years old, to Haakon Haakonsson the Young, the eldest son of King Haakon IV of Norway. Presumably later that year, Birger led an expedition to Finland, later dubbed as the Second Swedish Crusade, which permanently established the Swedish rule in Finland. On King Eric's death in 1250, Birger's son Valdemar was elected as the new king while Birger acted as regent, holding the true power in Sweden until his death.

In 1252, a year after another victory over the folkungs at the Battle of Herrevadsbro (Slaget vid Herrevadsbro), Birger wrote two carefully dated letters, the first mention of Stockholm interpreted as the foundation of the city or at least some sort of special interest in the location.  Neither of the letters give a description of the location, however, and while archaeological traces of older defensive structures have been found there, what did exist on the premises before the mid 13th century remains debated.  It has been suggested Birger chose the location for several reasons: Partly to curb domestic magnates by isolating them with a "lock of Lake Mälaren", offering a defense to the lands around Mälaren from invading enemies in the process; and to create a commercial bridgehead to attract German merchants.  While Birger's direct involvement in the foundation of the city remains speculative, it probably was no accident it was founded on the location at this time, as there were alternative passages into Mälaren during the preceding Viking Era; as Crusades, a kind of Viking raids in a Christian disguise, had proven increasingly unsuccessful; and as taking control over the location, traditionally where men supposedly gathered before the ledung, meant old offensive military traditions could be replaced by more "modern" commercial efforts directed towards Lübeck.  Birger thus combined financial support from Germany with papal political support to consolidate his own position.

Late life 
Ingeborg died in 1254 and in 1261 Birger married the Danish queen dowager Matilda of Holstein. Birger died on 21 October 1266, at Jälbolung in Västergötland. His grave in Varnhem Abbey was opened in May 2002.

There is a statue of the great duke in his own square Birger Jarls Torg next to Riddarholm Church in Stockholm, erected by Bengt Erland Fogelberg at the expense of the Governor of Stockholm in 1854. There is a cenotaph for him at the base of the tower of Stockholm City Hall. It was originally intended that his remains be removed there, but this was never done. Several other historical structures there are also named for him including the street Birger Jarlsgatan on Norrmalm and the tower Birger Jarls Torn  on Riddarholmen. The Hotel Birger Jarl is located in Stockholm's Norrmalm neighborhood. He is also the central figure of Bröllopet på Ulvåsa by Frans Hedberg (1865).

Children 
Source:

Mother unknown 
 Gregers Birgersson

From marriage with Ingeborg Eriksdotter of Sweden
The marriage was contracted relatively near the time when Ingeborg's brother the once-deposed Eric XI returned from exile in Denmark in 1234.
 Rikissa Birgersdotter, born 1238, married firstly 1251 Haakon Haakonsson the Young, co-king of Norway, and secondly, Henry I, Prince of Werle
 Valdemar Birgersson, born c 1238, king of Sweden 1250–1275, lord of parts of Gothenland until 1278
 Christina Birgersdotter, married presumably several times, one of her husbands was lord Sigge Guttormsson
 Magnus Birgersson, born 1240, Duke (of Södermanland), then king of Sweden 1275–90
 probably: Catherine of Sweden, born 1245, married Siegfried, Count of Anhalt
 Eric Birgersson, born 1250, Duke (of Småland)
 probably: Ingeborg of Sweden, born ca. 1254, died 30 June 1302, married John I of Saxony, Duke of Lauenburg in 1270
 Benedict, Duke of Finland, born 1254, bishop of Linköping

See also
 Ingeborg Eriksdotter of Sweden, Duchess of Sweden 1248–1254
 Matilda of Holstein, Duchess of Sweden 1261–1288

References

Bibliography

External links

Birger Magnusson Genealogy

1200 births
1266 deaths
Rulers of Finland
Swedish politicians
Swedish nobility
History of Stockholm
Christians of the Second Swedish Crusade
Year of birth uncertain
13th-century Swedish people
House of Bjelbo
Burials at Varnhem Abbey
Swedish jarls
City founders